Jake Granville (born 7 February 1989) is an Australian professional rugby league footballer who plays as a  for the North Queensland Cowboys in the NRL. 

He previously played for the Brisbane Broncos in the National Rugby League. He was a member of the Cowboys' 2015 NRL Grand Final and 2016 World Club Challenge winning sides.

Background
Granville was born in Rockhampton, Queensland, Australia.

He played his junior football for Rockhampton Brothers and attended St Anthony's Catholic Primary School, Rockhampton and St. Brendan's College, Yeppoon, before being signed by the Wynnum Manly Seagulls.

Playing career

Early career
Granville played for Wynnum's Colts side in 2007, and in 2008, made his Queensland Cup debut for the club.

In 2009, Granville joined the Brisbane Broncos, playing for their NYC team before moving back to Wynnum Manly in 2010. At Wynnum, Granville helped the Seagulls to consecutive Grand Final victories in 2011 and 2012, being named man of the match in 2011, and representing Queensland Residents in 2012. Granville re-joined the Brisbane Broncos in 2013, on a one-year deal.

2013
In Round 10 of the 2013 NRL season, at the age of 24, Granville made his NRL debut for the Brisbane Broncos, coming off the bench in the side's 32-6 win over the Gold Coast Titans. Later that season, he represented the Queensland Residents side for the second time. On 29 August, Granville re-signed with the Brisbane club on a 12-month extension.

2014
In Round 15 of the 2014 NRL season, Granville scored his first NRL try in the Broncos 19-10 loss to the New Zealand Warriors.

A week later in Round 16, Granville was again promoted to the Brisbane starting line-up (after earning his first start against the Warriors in Round 15) against Cronulla, Granville was one of Brisbane's best in the club's two point loss. With regular Hooker Andrew McCullough back from injury in Round 17, Granville's impressive form saw him nail down a spot on the Broncos bench, Granville scored his 2nd NRL try against the Penrith Panthers in Round 17.

On 22 July 2014, Granville signed a two-year contract with the North Queensland Cowboys, linking up with his former Wynnum Manly coach Paul Green.

2015
In Round 1 of the 2015 NRL season, Granville earned a spot on the North Queensland bench, beating Ray Thompson and Lachlan Coote as Paul Green's preferred utility option. By Round 4 of the 2015 NRL season, Granville had solidified himself as North Queensland's starting hooker. Granville scored his first try for North Queensland in Round 6 against South Sydney after a 50-metre break, which included running past Greg Inglis, the Cowboys won the match 30-12. In Round 7, Granville scored a hat-trick, including the game-winning try, in the Cowboys' 28-24 victory over the New Zealand Warriors. Many hailed Granville as the NRL's signing of the season with many pundits stating Granville was the form Hooker of the NRL competition in season 2015. In Round 20 against the Parramatta Eels, Granville took home man of the match honours ahead of Johnathan Thurston in the 46-4 point thrashing. Granville ran for 191 metres (from 12 runs) in this match, to go along with his six tackle breaks, three line breaks, two line break assists, two try assists & a try of his own. On 2 August, Granville was named Cowboys' Members Player of the Year.

On 4 October 2015, Granville was a member of North Queensland's Grand Final winning side, starting a hooker in the side's 17-16 victory over the Brisbane Broncos. Granville set up Justin O'Neill and James Tamou for the Cowboys' first two tries of the match and was a candidate to win the Clive Churchill Medal, which eventually went to co-captain Johnathan Thurston.

At the North Queensland awards night on 9 October, half a week after the club's Grand Final victory, Granville was named North Queensland's Player's Player of the Year. Granville finished runner-up in the Cowboys Player of the Year voting, just falling one point short to co-captain Johnathan Thurston.

On 27 October, The Courier-Mail listed Granville as the NRL's best hooker. On 27 November, Granville extended his contract with the Cowboys to the end of 2018.

2016
On 12 January, Granville was selected in the QAS Emerging Origin squad. On 21 February, he was a member of the Cowboys' 2016 World Club Challenge winning side, starting at hooker in the side's 38-4 victory over the Leeds Rhinos at Headingley Stadium. On 5 May, he was named at hooker in QRL journalist Tony Webeck's Queensland Residents team of the past 10 years.

2017
In January, Granville was once again selected in the QAS Emerging Origin squad. On 1 October, Granville started at hooker in North Queensland's 2017 NRL Grand Final loss to the Melbourne Storm. He finished the 2017 season having playing 24 games, starting all at hooker, and scoring four tries.

2018
Granville played all 24 games for the Cowboys in 2018, starting at hooker in every game and scoring one try. In Round 13, he played his 100th NRL game in the Cowboys' 26–12 win over the Manly-Warringah Sea Eagles. In Round 24, he played his 100th NRL game for the Cowboys in their 44–6 win over the Parramatta Eels.
Granville extended his contract with the Cowboys until the end of 2021 Season

2019
For the second consecutive year, Granville played in all 24 of North Queensland's games, starting at hooker in all but one game.

2020
In February, Granville was a member of the Cowboys' 2020 NRL Nines winning squad. 

He started the 2020 season as the Cowboys' starting  but was dropped in favour of Reece Robson, following the club's Round 4 loss to the Cronulla-Sutherland Sharks. He returned to the side in Round 13, playing just four more games, all off the bench. Granville finished the season having played just eight games, his lowest total since joining the Cowboys in 2015.

2021
In Round 17, Granville played his 150th first grade game for North Queensland. He became the 16th player in the club's history to do so.

2022
Granville played 14 games for North Queensland in the 2022 NRL season which all came from the interchange bench as the club finished third on the table and qualified for the finals.  Granville did not play in either of North Queensland's finals matches which saw them reach the preliminary final before being defeated by Parramatta.

Achievements and accolades

Individual
North Queensland Cowboys Players' Player of the Year: 2015
North Queensland Cowboys Members' Player of the Year: 2015

Team
2015 NRL Grand Final: North Queensland Cowboys – Winners
2016 World Club Challenge: North Queensland Cowboys – Winners
2020 NRL Nines: North Queensland Cowboys – Winners

Statistics

NRL
 Statistics are correct to the end of the 2020 season

Personal life
Granville is engaged to Zoe Hunt, the sister of St George Illawarra Dragons halfback Ben Hunt.

References

External links
North Queensland Cowboys profile
NRL profile

1988 births
Living people
Australian rugby league players
Brisbane Broncos players
North Queensland Cowboys players
Rugby league players from Rockhampton, Queensland
Wynnum Manly Seagulls players